Beckfoot School is a coeducational secondary school and sixth form with academy status, in Bingley, West Yorkshire, England.

The school has previously gained Technology College status, specialist school status in the Arts, Artsmark Gold and a Sportsmark Award. It also has a Charter Mark for services to the community and is a City Learning Centre. The school converted to academy status in August 2013. In December 2016, the school received World Class Schools Quality Mark. It is one of the three first schools in northern England to get the status.

Beckfoot School is also a training school that has attained 'Investors in People' and a 'School Achievement Award'. The school moved into new, purpose-built, premises in June 2011 and the old buildings were demolished in 2012.  The new premises are shared with Hazelbeck School.

The school has above-average A*–C grades in GCSEs and is taking part in the new fast-track Modern Foreign Language and Media Studies GCSE scheme.

Sixth form
The School's sixth form was awarded Grade 1 (outstanding) status in its June 2014 Ofsted inspection. Qualifications offered are A-Levels and BTEC national diploma.

Beckfoot Trust

As an academy, Beckfoot School is the founding school of the Beckfoot Trust, a multi-academy trust. Hazelbeck School joined the trust in 2013 and Beckfoot Upper Heaton in 2015. Beckfoot Thornton joined in 2016. Former headteacher, David Horn, is the head of the Beckfoot Trust and was replaced with Gillian Halls as headteacher. Ms. Halls has since joined Mr. Horn in running the Beckfoot Trust. She has been replaced by Mr. Simon Wade, former headteacher of Beckfoot Upper-Heaton.

Notable former pupils
 Girls Aloud star Kimberley Walsh – attended the school under its previous name of Beckfoot Grammar School
 Georgina Roberts – England Ladies Rugby Union attended Beckfoot until 2002
 Footballer Danny Ward – attended the school
 Footballer James Hanson – attended the school from 1999 to 2004
 Katie Pattison-Hart – member of the first female crew of five to row the Atlantic

References

Secondary schools in the City of Bradford
Bingley
Academies in the City of Bradford